Kang Sung-hoon (born 4 June 1987), also known as Sung Kang, is a South Korean professional golfer who plays on the PGA Tour. He won the 2019 AT&T Byron Nelson, his first win on the PGA Tour.

Amateur career
In April 2006 Kang won the SBS Lotte Skyhill Open, the opening event of the Korean Tour season. Later in the month he played in the 2006 Bonallack Trophy in New Zealand, representing Asia/Pacific against Europe. In October he represented South Korea in the 2006 Eisenhower Trophy in South Africa. The team finished 5th while Kang had the 6th best individual score. He was also the gold medalist at the 2006 Asian Games, which exempted him from mandatory military service.

Professional career
Kang turned professional in 2007 and joined the Korean Tour. He first gained international prominence in 2009 when he lost in a playoff for the Ballantine's Championship, a tournament co-sanctioned by the Korean Tour, the European Tour and the Asian Tour. In 2010 Kang won for his first Korean Tour event as a professional at the Eugene Securities Open, and ended the season by finished tied for 16th place in the PGA Tour qualifying school to gain a place on the tour for 2011.

In May 2011, Kang lost a playoff for the BMW Charity Pro-Am on the Nationwide Tour. The following month, he qualified for the U. S. Open, his first major, and finished in a tie for 39th. Kang retained his PGA Tour card for 2012, helped by finishing tied for third place at the Children's Miracle Network Classic, ending the season 120th on the money list. In October 2011 he was a runner-up in the Shinhan Donghae Open, a Korean Tour event, finishing a stroke behind Paul Casey. 2012 was a much less successful season and he failed to retain his place on the tour.

Kang played on the Web.com Tour from 2013 to 2015. In October 2013 he won two tournaments in Korea in successive weeks, the CJ Invitational and the Kolon Korea Open. He did not win on the Web.com Tour but was runner-up in the Utah Championship in both 2014 and 2015, losing in a playoff in 2015 to Patton Kizzire. He finished 2015 in 22nd place in the Web.com Tour regular season standings to earn a return to the PGA Tour for 2016.

Since 2016 Kang has played on the PGA Tour. At the 2016 AT&T Pebble Beach National Pro-Am, Kang shot a course record 60 during the second round at the Monterrey Peninsula course. This took him into a share of the lead moving into the weekend: he finished the tournament tied for 17th. The following two weeks he finished in the top 10 in the Northern Trust Open and The Honda Classic.

In April 2017, Kang took a three shot lead into the final round of the Shell Houston Open, the first time in his career he had held the 54-hole lead in a PGA Tour event. He finished second to Russell Henley. Two weeks later a good result in the RBC Heritage moved him into the top-100 of the world rankings for the first time, receiving an entry to the 2017 PGA Championship. He also finished tied for 5th in the Quicken Loans National, one of the Open Qualifying Series, to get an entry to the 2017 Open Championship. He tied for 44th place in both his 2017 major appearances.

In July 2018, Kang was involved in a rules controversy at the Quicken Loans National tournament when he was accused of cheating by his playing partner Joel Dahmen. On the dogleg-left 566-yard par-5 10th hole, Kang's second shot landed in the hazard left of the green. After a short search, a spotter located Kang's ball some 5 to 8 yards into the hazard. There was no way Kang could play the ball. Instead, he began pointing to the spot at which he thought it had entered the hazard; nearly pin-high. Because the 10th hole is a dogleg left with a hazard all the way down the left side, Kang's ball would have needed to re-cross the hazard nearer the green in order to earn the drop he was requesting. The exact line his ball had taken en route to its final resting place thus came under careful scrutiny. There was a discussion with a rules official, Dahmen and Kang which reached an impasse as another group played through. After further discussion, Kang conceded that his ball more likely crossed the hazard 35 yards from the pin rather than his first suggestion. Kang dropped the ball at a point 37 yards from the hole, hit his approach to 17 feet, and holed the putt for a par. Later that night, Dahmen accused Kang of cheating on Twitter. The PGA Tour released a statement indicating that they regarded the issue as closed: "With no clear evidence to prove otherwise, it was determined by the official that Kang could proceed with his fourth shot as intended, following a penalty stroke and subsequent drop. The PGA Tour will have no additional comment on this matter." Kang finished third in the event, his best result of the season, and earned a place in the field for the 2018 Open Championship, while Dahmen finished T23.

In May 2019, Kang won the AT&T Byron Nelson for his first PGA Tour victory in his 159th start. He matched the course record with a 10-under 61 in the second round, and matched the tournament record with a 23-under 261 total.

Personal life
Kang and his wife, Kang So-young, have a son.

Professional wins (5)

PGA Tour wins (1)

Asian Tour wins (1)

1Co-sanctioned by the Korean Tour

Asian Tour playoff record (0–1)

OneAsia Tour wins (1)

1Co-sanctioned by the Korean Tour

Korean Tour wins (4)

1Co-sanctioned by the Asian Tour
2Co-sanctioned by the OneAsia Tour

Playoff record
European Tour playoff record (0–1)

Web.com Tour playoff record (0–2)

Results in major championships
Results not in chronological order in 2020.

CUT = missed the half-way cut
"T" = tied
NT = No tournament due to COVID-19 pandemic

Summary

Most consecutive cuts made – 6 (2011 U.S. Open – 2019 PGA Championship)
Longest streak of top-10s – 1

Results in The Players Championship

CUT = missed the halfway cut
"T" indicates a tie for a place
C = Cancelled after the first round due to the COVID-19 pandemic

Results in World Golf Championships

1Cancelled due to COVID-19 pandemic

NT = No tournament
"T" = Tied

Team appearances
Amateur
Eisenhower Trophy (representing South Korea): 2006
Bonallack Trophy (representing Asia/Pacific): 2006

Professional
EurAsia Cup (representing Asia): 2018

See also
2010 PGA Tour Qualifying School graduates
2015 Web.com Tour Finals graduates

References

External links

South Korean male golfers
PGA Tour golfers
Asian Tour golfers
Korn Ferry Tour graduates
Asian Games medalists in golf
Asian Games gold medalists for South Korea
Golfers at the 2006 Asian Games
Medalists at the 2006 Asian Games
Yonsei University alumni
Sportspeople from Jeju Province
1987 births
Living people